Janaki may refer to:

 Janaki, Iran (disambiguation)
 Janaki Rural Municipality (disambiguation), rural municipalities in Nepal
 Sita, a Hindu goddess of the Ramayana

People with the name
 Janaki Ballabh Patnaik or J. B. Patnaik, leader of Indian National Congress and a former chief minister of Orissa
 V. N. Janaki Ramachandran (1923–1996) Indian Tamil actress and former Chief Minister of Tamil Nadu
 Janaki Srinivasa Murthy, popularly known as Vaidehi, Kannada language writer
 S. Janaki, Indian playback singer
 Sowcar Janaki, Indian actress
 Janaki Mandir, a Hindu temple at the heart of Janakpur, Nepal dedicated to goddess Seeta
 Janakiammal, wife of Srinivasa Ramanujan
 Janaki Ammal, Indian scientist (botanist)

Feminine given names